Gilbert Cassidy Gawing (born 3 March 1977) is a Malaysian former professional footballer.

Club career
He played as a midfielder with Sarawak FA in his entire professional career before retiring in 2006. He was also in the Olympic 2000 team that were playing in the Malaysian League for the 1998 season. Gilbert were renowned for his expertise is dead-ball situations such as scoring goals from direct free-kicks.

Gilbert scored the first goal of the newly formed Malaysia Super League in 2004.

National team
Gilbert represented Malaysia 8 times from 1998 to 2003, scoring 2 goals. Early in his career, he was in the Malaysia national under-21 football team that competes in the 1997 FIFA World Youth Championship, held in Malaysia.

International Senior Goals

Honours

Club
Sarawak FA
 Malaysia FA Cup runner-up: 2001

References

External links
 

1977 births
Living people
Malaysian footballers
Malaysia international footballers
Sarawak FA players
People from Sarawak
Association football midfielders